Anti-nihilism may refer to:

 An opposition to the philosophy of nihilism
 Trivialism, the theory of logic that all propositions are true
 Anti-nihilistic novel, a genre of 19th century Russian literature